Peter John Collins (6 November 1931 – 3 August 1958) was a British racing driver. He was killed in the 1958 German Grand Prix, just weeks after winning the RAC British Grand Prix. He started his career as a 17-year-old in 1949, impressing in Formula 3 races, finishing third in the 1951 Autosport National Formula 3 Championship.

Early life and racing career

Born on 6 November 1931, Collins grew up in Mustow Green, Kidderminster, Worcestershire, England. The son of a motor-garage owner and haulage merchant, Collins became interested in motor vehicles at a young age. He was expelled from school at 16 owing to spending time at a local fairground during school hours. He became an apprentice in his father's garage and began competing in local trials races.

In common with many British drivers of the time, Collins began racing in the 500 cc category (adopted as Formula 3 at the end of 1950), when his parents bought him a Cooper 500 from the fledgling Cooper Car Company. Success for Collins started once he switched to the JBS-Norton in 1951. Those small vehicles, powered by Norton motorcycle engines, were also the proving ground of many of Collins's F1 contemporaries, including Stirling Moss.

His breakthrough came, away from the track, when at a party hosted by the great pre-war lady racer, Kay Petre, Collins managed to inveigle himself with John Wyer, the team principal at Aston Martin, earning his test drive at Silverstone. During that test, Aston was joined by the Formula 2 team, HWM – and by the time the teams were preparing to leave, Collins had a contract with both.

At HWM Collins he became part of a three-car team with Lance Macklin and Moss, and they competed in most of the F2 races in Britain and in Europe. Collins showed in speed, but the underfinanced HWM-Alta rarely finished a race. His best result was second place in the Grand Prix des Sables d'Olonne. Collins got his Formula One break in 1952, with HWM when he replaced Moss. His best result in a World Championship event that year was sixth in the French Grand Prix at Rouen-Les-Essarts.

Success did not come the team's way, and Collins left after the 1953 season. Not known for his technical knowledge, Collins was happy to have his mechanics set up his car, and he simply drove it with his consummate natural skill. This was evident in 1954, when Tony Vandervell signed Collins to drive the fearsome "Thinwall Special". The potent machine was a crowd pleaser at Formula Libre events. He was also amongst the first to handle the "Vanwall Special" on the world stage, but he only finished seventh in the Italian Grand Prix at Monza.

After being a constant thorn in BRM's side, he joined the team for the 1955 season. He raced a Maserati 250F belonging to team owner, Alfred Owen, winning the BRDC International Trophy and the London Trophy. These results led to a drive with the works Maserati in the Italian Grand Prix.

Meanwhile, he had better success in sportscars. Throughout the first half of the 1950s, Collins was a stalwart performer for the Aston Martin team, scoring a sensational victory at the 1952 Goodwood Nine Hours race. The following year he took the Aston Martin DB3S he shared with Pat Griffith to victory in the RAC Tourist Trophy at Dundrod. Further successes included second places in an Aston Martin DB3S at Le Mans in 1955 and 1956 with Paul Frère and Moss respectively.

Later career
For the 1956 season, Collins joined Ferrari on the strength of a superb drive in the previous year's Targa Florio, in which he partnered Moss to victory in a Mercedes-Benz 300 SLR. This proved to be a turning point, with a solid second-place finish behind Moss at the Monaco Grand Prix, and wins at the Belgian and French Grands Prix. In those early days at Ferrari, Collins earned the unstinting admiration of Enzo Ferrari, devastated by the untimely death from muscular dystrophy at age 24 of his son, Dino, and who turned to Collins for solace, treating him as a member of the family.

Collins was on the verge of becoming Britain's first F1 World Champion when he handed his Lancia-Ferrari D50 over to team leader Juan Manuel Fangio after the latter suffered a steering-arm failure toward the end of the Italian Grand Prix at Monza. Collins eventually finished second, but the advantage handed to Moss, and the extra points gained by Fangio's finish, demoted Collins to third place in the championship. Collins's selfless act gained him respect from Enzo Ferrari and high praise from Fangio: "I was moved almost to tears by the gesture... Peter was one of the finest and greatest gentlemen I ever met in my racing career." 

Meanwhile, in sports cars, he finished second in a Ferrari 860 Monza in the Mille Miglia and at the Swedish Sports Car GP in a Ferrari 290MM with Wolfgang von Trips in 1956; and then in 1957 finished second in the 1000km of Nürburgring with Olivier Gendebien and won the Venezuelan Grand Prix with Phil Hill, all in a Ferrari 335 S. Finally, in 1958 he won the 1000 km Buenos Aires and the 12 Hours of Sebring in a Ferrari 250 TR with Phil Hill. These three were back-to-back. His last World Sports Car Championship podium was another second place at the 'Ring with Mike Hawthorn.

Also in 1956, Collins moved to Monaco to avoid compulsory military service in the British Army and thus continue his racing career.

In January 1957, Collins married American actress Louise King, daughter of the executive assistant to UN Secretary General Dag Hammarskjöld, and the couple took up residence on a yacht in Monaco harbour. In the same year, Collins was joined at Ferrari by Hawthorn. The two became very close friends, even arranging to split their winnings between each other, and together engaged in a fierce rivalry with fellow Ferrari driver Luigi Musso. However, despite a third-place finish at the German Grand Prix, Ferrari were disadvantaged for much of the season as the 801 model (an evolution of the 1954 Lancia D50) was overweight and underpowered. However, Collins did score some wins that season, taking victory in the non-championship Syracuse and Naples Grands Prix.

1958 saw the introduction of the new, improved Ferrari Dino 246 and results started to improve for Scuderia Ferrari. Although achieving few results in the first half of the season, Collins improved and won the non-championship BRDC International Trophy at Silverstone, then finished third at the Monaco Grand Prix. However, Enzo Ferrari felt Collins was distracted by his supposed playboy lifestyle. The Monaco yacht where he lived was considered a perpetual party by Ferrari, who thought Collins was distracted and no longer focused on driving and developing sports cars.

Collins was sacked by Ferrari after deliberately damaging the clutch in his car, which he shared with Mike Hawthorn during the 24 Hours of Le Mans rather than race in a rainstorm, and was found drinking in a pub in England before the end of the race. Ferrari relented and allowed Collins to drive an F2 car until the end of the season. At the French Grand Prix at Reims, Hawthorn refused to start unless Collins was allowed to start in a F1 car. He did, and finished fifth. Ferrari immediately sacked Collins again. Hawthorn responded by flying to Italy and storming the Ferrari headquarters in Modena. Having smashed down locked doors, Hawthorn told Enzo Ferrari he would not drive for him again unless Collins was given his Formula One seat again; Ferrari relented.

Following Musso's death at Reims, Ferrari was left without one of his top drivers, and so Collins's position was for now safe. At the British Grand Prix at Silverstone, Collins achieved perhaps his greatest drive. Under team orders and desiring to help his friend Hawthorn win the Championship, Collins led from the start, running flat out in an effort to beat the Vanwall of Moss. Although in an inferior car to the main contenders, by driving at the limit for 45 laps Collins gradually pulled away from Moss until his Vanwall expired and Collins won. The Ferrari team management decided not to slow Collins down and flag Hawthorn through to the win after Collins's great drive. Moss's future patron, Rob Walker, told Collins after the race that he found Collins's driving frightening and he should never drive like that again. It was his third and final career victory.

Death
During the 1958 German Grand Prix at the Nürburgring, whilst chasing Tony Brooks's Vanwall, Collins had a fatal crash. After pushing hard to keep pace, Collins went into the Pflanzgarten section of the circuit too quickly causing his Ferrari to run wide, encountering a ditch. Collins lost control of his car, it flipped into the air and landed upside down. Collins was thrown from the car and struck a tree, sustaining critical head injuries. Despite treatment Collins died later in the afternoon at a hospital in Bonn. His death was almost identical to the fate which his Ferrari teammate Luigi Musso suffered. Teammate Mike Hawthorn was so disturbed by Collins's death that he retired from racing immediately after winning the 1958 Drivers' Championship. Hawthorn himself died during the following year after an automobile accident on the A3 bypass near Guildford, Surrey, England. In Tony Brooks's autobiography, he recalled that he drove harder in that race, in the duel with Collins and Hawthorn, than at any other time in his life but, as in earlier duels with Fangio, the Ferrari pair were passing and repassing only on the safer North and South curves.

Rivalry with Luigi Musso
Many years after the death of Peter Collins, Fiamma Breschi, Luigi Musso's girlfriend at the time of his death, revealed in a television documentary entitled The Secret Life of Enzo Ferrari the rivalry between teammates Collins, Hawthorn and Musso. Breschi recalled that the antagonism between Musso and the two English drivers encouraged all three to take risks: "The Englishmen (Hawthorn and Collins) had an agreement," she says. "Whichever of them won, they would share the winnings equally. It was the two of them against Luigi, who was not part of the agreement. Strength comes in numbers, and they were united against him. This antagonism was actually favourable rather than damaging to Ferrari. The faster the drivers went, the more likely it was that a Ferrari would win."

Personal life
Collins married Louise King in 1957, one week after they met in Miami, having proposed after two days. Louise was American, and her father was a US representative to the United Nations. She would be widowed in 1958 when Collins crashed at the Nürburgring. She was interviewed in the movie Ferrari: Race to Immortality.

Racing record

Career highlights

Complete World Drivers' Championship results
(key)

* Shared drive

Non-Championship results
(key) (Races in bold indicate pole position) (Races in italics indicate fastest lap)

Complete 24 Hours of Le Mans results

Complete 12 Hours of Sebring results

Complete Mille Miglia results

References

Further reading
Ed McDonough Peter Collins: All About the Boy. Merican Manuals Ltd.

External links

Peter Collins profile at The 500 Owners Association
 This Charming Man

1931 births
1958 deaths
24 Hours of Le Mans drivers
Brighton Speed Trials people
English expatriate sportspeople in Germany
English expatriate sportspeople in Monaco
English Formula One drivers
English racing drivers
Ferrari Formula One drivers
Formula One race winners
Hersham and Walton Motors Formula One drivers
Vanwall Formula One drivers
Maserati Formula One drivers
World Sportscar Championship drivers
Mille Miglia drivers
12 Hours of Sebring drivers
People educated at Bromsgrove School
Sportspeople from Kidderminster
Racing drivers who died while racing
Sport deaths in Germany